The Blackwell–Tapia Prize is a mathematics award that recognizes someone who has made significant research contributions in their field and has worked to address the problem of under-representation of minority groups in mathematics. It is presented every other year at the Blackwell-Tapia Conference, which promotes mathematical excellence by minority researchers and is sponsored by the National Science Foundation. The prize is named for David Blackwell and Richard Tapia.

Recipients 

The following mathematicians have been honored with the Blackwell–Tapia Prize:

See also

 List of mathematics awards

References

Mathematics awards